South Korean boy band NCT Dream have released two studio albums, two reissues, one live album, five extended plays, one single album, and eleven singles. A sub-unit of the boy band NCT, the group debuted in 2016 with the digital single "Chewing Gum", which was later featured on their first single album The First, released alongside its lead single "My First and Last" in 2017. Later that year, they released their first extended play, We Young, alongside its lead single of the same name. In 2018, they recorded the single "Go" for NCT's first studio album as a complete group, titled NCT 2018 Empathy. Their second extended play, We Go Up, was their first entry  on the Oricon Albums Chart, charting at number 11. It was released in September 2018 alongside its lead single of the same name. The following year, they released their third extended play, We Boom. It spawned one single, "Boom". Their first Japanese-language extended play, The Dream, released in January 2020, was their first release to chart atop the Oricon Albums Chart. In April 2020, they released their fifth extended play, Reload. It spawned one single, "Ridin'".

Their first studio album, Hot Sauce, was released in May 2021 and was their first release to be certified 2× Million by the Korea Music Content Association (KMCA). Its lead single of the same name was their first song to chart atop the Gaon Digital Chart and became their first entry on the Billboard Global 200, charting at number 96. The reissue of the album, titled Hello Future, was released shortly afterwards alongside a second single and was certified Million by the KMCA. They released their second studio album, Glitch Mode, in March 2022, followed by its reissue, Beatbox, in May 2022. The album was their first entry on the Billboard 200, charting at number 50, and was certified 2× Million by the KMCA, while Beatbox was certified Million. It spawned two singles: "Glitch Mode" and "Beatbox". In February 2023, NCT Dream released their first Japanese-language single album, Best Friend Ever, along with its lead single of the same name, which reached number three on the Billboard Japan Hot 100, becoming their highest ranking song on the chart to date.

Albums

Studio albums

Reissues

Live albums

Single albums

Extended plays

Singles

Promotional singles

Collaborations

As featured artist

Other charted songs

Notes

References 

Discography
Discographies of South Korean artists
K-pop music group discographies